Armenia participated in and hosted the Junior Eurovision Song Contest 2022 in Yerevan, having internally selected its representative, Nare with the song "Dance!", written by Grigor Kyokchyan and Nick Egibyan.

Background 

Prior to the 2022 contest, Armenia had participated in the Junior Eurovision Song Contest fourteen times since its first entry in 2007. Armenia then hosted the Junior Eurovision Song Contest 2011 in Yerevan. In the 2019 contest, Karina Ignatyan represented her country in Gliwice, Poland with the song "Colours of Your Dream". The song ended 9th out of 19 entries with 115 points.

Despite being included on the final list of participating countries, Armenia withdrew from the  contest in November 2020 due to the then-ongoing Nagorno-Karabakh war. It was later revealed that Maléna had been internally selected to represent Armenia with the song "Why". With the Nagorno-Karabakh war ending on 10 November, Armenia's head of delegation David Tserunyan wrote on Instagram that the country would "come back stronger than ever". Armenia again selected Maléna to represent the country with "Qami Qami", and ultimately won the contest with 224 points.

Before Junior Eurovision 
An audition round with 30 shortlisted artists out of over 100 applications was held in August 2022. The participants performed in front of a five-member jury consisting of David Tserunyan (Armenian Head of Delegation in the Junior Eurovision Song Contest), Anushik Ter-Ghukasyan (head of music department at AMPTV), Dalita (Armenian representative in the Junior Eurovision Song Contest 2011), Rosa Linn (Armenian representative in the Eurovision Song Contest 2022) and Lilith Navasardyan (songwriter for multiple Armenian Eurovision entries).  On 28 October 2022, AMPTV revealed that Nare Ghazaryan would represent Armenia in the contest. Her entry, "Dance!", written by Grigor Kyokchyan and Nick Egibyan, was presented to the public on 12 November 2022, accompanied by an official music video which was directed by Aramayis Hayrapetyan and produced by Gravity Production.

At Junior Eurovision 
After the opening ceremony, which took place on 5 December 2022, it was announced that Armenia would perform fifteenth on 11 December 2022, following Serbia and preceding Ukraine.

Voting

Detailed voting results

References 

Armenia
2022
Junior Eurovision Song Contest